Carrick was a railway station on the Main South railway line in New South Wales, Australia. It opened in 1869 initially as Towrang and closed to passenger services in 1975. It was later completely demolished and no trace of the station now survives.

References

Railway stations in Australia opened in 1869
Railway stations closed in 1975
Disused regional railway stations in New South Wales
Main Southern railway line, New South Wales